Microchlamylla gracilis, sometimes known by the common name slender eolis, is a species of sea slug, an aeolid nudibranch, a marine gastropod mollusc in the family Flabellinidae.

Distribution
This species was described from Cullercoats, North Sea. It is a fairly common species found in current-swept sites from northern France to Norway and Iceland. It is also reported from the East coast of North America from Newfoundland south to New England.

Description
This Microchlamylla has a narrow body and cerata in well defined clusters. The cerata have a narrow band of white pigment at the tip which is often broken into spots. Mature animals typically measure 12–15 mm in length. The maximum recorded body length is 25 mm.

Ecology
Minimum recorded depth is 0 m. Maximum recorded depth is 33 m.

The diet of this species is hydroids of the genus Eudendrium.

References

Flabellinidae
Gastropods described in 1844